Elmer "Len" Dresslar Jr. (March 25, 1925 – October 16, 2005) was an American voice actor and vocalist. He is best known as the deep bass voice of the Jolly Green Giant in commercials for General Mills.

Early life
He served as a gunner's mate in the United States Navy. After serving in the navy, he moved to Chicago to study voice. While there, he gradually built up a reputation both in jazz circles (as a member of The Singers Unlimited, he recorded 15 albums) and as a voice actor. He recorded jingles and other spots for many well-known brands including Amoco, Dinty Moore, Marlboro, and Rice Krispies cereal.

Career 
Len Dresslar charted the hits "Chain Gang" (not to  be confused with the Sam Cooke song) and "These Hands" on Mercury 70774. Prior to his 1970s stand in the Singers Unlimited, he was a member of the J's with Jamie.

Personal life 
After retiring from advertising, he moved to California. He died of cancer in 2005.

References

1925 births
2005 deaths
People from St. Francis, Kansas
United States Navy sailors
Singers from Chicago
American male voice actors
American jazz singers
Deaths from cancer in California
20th-century American singers
Jazz musicians from Illinois